Greta Cicolari (born 23 August 1982) is an Italian beach volleyball player. As of 2012, she plays with Marta Menegatti. They qualified for the 2012 Summer Olympics in London and reached the quarter-finals.

References 

1982 births
Italian beach volleyball players
Living people
Beach volleyball players at the 2012 Summer Olympics
Olympic beach volleyball players of Italy
Beach volleyball players of Centro Sportivo Aeronautica Militare